Grenada participated in the 2006 Commonwealth Games in Melbourne. As of July 2014, Alleyne Francique's silver medal in the 400 metres remains the sole Grenadan Commonwealth Games medal.

Medals

Silver
 Alleyne Francique — Athletics, Men's 400 metres

See also
Grenada at the 2007 Pan American Games
Grenada at the 2008 Summer Olympics

References

 

2006
Grenada
Commonwealth Games